Nitro Rallycross (Nitro RX, abbreviated to NRX) is an American rallycross racing series. Created by rallycross driver Travis Pastrana and the Nitro Circus production in 2018, its inaugural season began in 2021. The championship is sanctioned by the United States Auto Club.

History
From 2018 to 2019, rallycross was a sport in the Nitro World Games at Utah Motorsports Campus. In late 2020, it expanded into its own series with plans of running the inaugural season in 2021 and debuting an electric class in 2022.

Although American rallycross leagues like the Global Rallycross Championship and Americas Rallycross Championship had failed, NRX founder Pastrana envisioned the series as an inexpensive discipline that did not need to rely on heavy manufacturer support.

NRX cars raced with exclusively internal combustion engines in 2021 while the electric Group E class was introduced in 2022. Group E's electric vehicles are built using a battery-powered SUV platform called the FC1-X, which is developed by First Corner – a joint venture between QEV Technologies and Olsbergs MSE, the project received manufacturer support such as Ford, Subaru, and Volkswagen. The FC1-X began testing in February 2021 and made its racing debut at the 2022 Race of Champions.

Tracks
NRX tracks are purpose built with mixed surfaces and jumps. Speaking with DirtFish in March 2020, Pastrana stressed the construction of such courses with an emphasis on dirt, high-banked corners, and large jumps, comparing his plans to motocross courses as "every track was unique." As part of the series' development, Pastrana built a test circuit near his house. The series also races on short course dirt tracks used in the defunct Lucas Oil Off Road Racing Series such as Wild Horse Pass Motorsports Park in Arizona.

For the second season in 2022–23, the series expanded to include races in Canada, Saudi Arabia, and Lydden Hill Race Circuit in England.

Race format
Race weekends feature the main Supercar class, the NEXT developmental division, and the electric Group E class. While the Supercars have one race per weekend, NEXT runs two. A weekend is split into two days, with the first consisting of qualifying while racing takes place on the second.

After single-lap qualifying is conducted, drivers are paired up into a bracket tournament called battles, with the winner of each battle receiving a point in the championship. The winner of the bracket is rewarded with pole position for the next day's races.

The second day features a series of qualifying races to reach the final, with the top two in each race advancing. The first pair of heat races have eight cars and last five laps apiece, and those remaining are placed into two semi-final races. Drivers who fail to qualify for the final via the heats and semi-finals enter a Last Chance Qualifier. The final consists of ten cars and points are allocated in five-point intervals beginning with 50 for the winner.

Champions

References

External links
 

Rallycross racing series
2021 establishments in the United States
Auto racing series in the United States
United States Auto Club